Desmond Vincent Tuddenham (born 29 January 1943) is a former Australian rules footballer who played for  and  in the Victorian Football League (VFL) during the 1960s and 1970s.

Early years and football career
Tuddenham was born and raised in Ross Creek, Victoria, a country town near Ballarat. He and his twin brother, Basil, were two of a large family consisting of nine children (seven boys and two girls) to parents William and Anne Tuddenham.

Tuddenham's upbringing was typical of country footballers who came from farming families. Before and after school and during weekends, he had to help with various farm chores. Sport, usually football or cricket, was played on Saturday, and the family attended church on Sundays. The daily grind of farm work helped to strengthen Tuddenham's shoulders and arms, and a fanatical attitude to fitness hardened his body.

Tuddenham played cricket with five of his brothers for Ross Creek, and football for the Young Christian Worker's club in Ballarat. In the space of three seasons he went from the Under-14s to the Under-19s side, and won the league's best and fairest trophy at 16.

Tuddenham attracted the attention of several VFL clubs. He made his VFL debut in 1962 against  at Arden Street Oval. His brand of football was fearless and tough, with a habit of grasping the football to his chest with his elbows sticking out dangerously.

In recognition of his toughness and skills, Tuddenham was appointed Collingwood captain in 1966. In the semi-final against , he kicked seven goals on Daryl Griffiths in a tense 10-point win to advance to the grand final. But St Kilda reversed the result two weeks later to take out the 1966 VFL Grand Final by one point, winning their first and only premiership so far.

Collingwood were eliminated from the 1967 finals by eventual runner-up  in the first semi-final. The Magpies trailed by one point at three-quarter time, but the Cats kicked six goals to one in the final quarter to win by 30 points. Tuddenham was reported for striking Geelong defender Geoff Ainsworth on the head with his forearm in the last quarter by field umpire Jeff Crouch. He was found guilty and suspended for four matches.
 
In February 1970, Tuddenham and his deputy Len Thompson were involved in a pay dispute after they learned that Collingwood had recruited its first interstate player, Peter Eakins, from Western Australian club  for a sign-on fee of A$5,000 and A$5,000 a season for three years. That was A$2,000 more than Tuddenham was receiving as captain. Tuddenham asked for A$8,000 over three seasons, and Thompson A$30,000 over five seasons, threatening to walk out if their demands were not met. Three weeks later, during which time there had been no negotiations, both players returned. Although their demands had not been met they did obtain a slightly improved salary; under the clubs terms, Tuddenham would receive A$125 per match plus VFL provident fund payments, and Thompson would earn A$105 per match.

Although Tuddenham was confident the little episode would not affect his chances of retaining the captaincy, the Magpies committee announced Terry Waters as captain for the 1970 VFL season and Tuddenham accepted the decision. Collingwood finished on top of the ladder with 18 wins and defeated arch-rivals  in a semi-final by 10 points to advance to the grand final. However, as had happened four years earlier against St Kilda, Carlton would reverse the result in the 1970 VFL Grand Final, coming from 44 points down at half-time to overrun Collingwood in the second half. Tuddenham was regarded among Collingwood's best players on the day. During the game he accidentally floored teammate Peter McKenna in the second quarter with a hip-and-shoulder bump meant for a Carlton player. McKenna had kicked five goals up to that stage of the game and would only add one more for the rest of the match.

In an interview 40 years later, Tuddenham cited a lack of fitness, as well as inaccurate kicking for goal, as the main reason Collingwood lost: "I suggested to (coach) Bob Rose after we lost the 1966 Grand Final to St Kilda by a point that he do the coaching and I look after the fitness along with my friend John Toleman. The idea was that I would be an assistant coach, and I'll tell you what, I would have got the buggers fit."

In 1971, Tuddenham became the first player to be named captain of the VFL representative team whilst not captain of his own club. When asked about this, state coach Tom Hafey replied bluntly: "We are not here to talk about Collingwood's mistakes."
  
He played four seasons for the Bombers before returning to Collingwood for his final two seasons.

In 1978 he was the senior coach of South Melbourne for a season, replaced by Ian Stewart when he failed to take the club to the finals. He coached VFA second division club Werribee to the finals in 1988, but left after he and the club concluded a playing coach would be better suited to the club's needs.

Life after football
Tuddenham ran a plastics manufacturing business, which he sold in 1979. He later worked as a scrap-metal dealer.

Tuddenham has four children.

Since retirement, Tuddenham has been in trouble with the law on several occasions.
In December 1980, he was found guilty by a County Court jury of having received stolen tyres valued at $30,000 and was remanded in custody.
In June 1989, he pleaded guilty to a charge of conspiring to defraud the Victorian Automobile Chamber of Commerce of $13,000. He told the magistrate that he was "guilty on the grounds I was helping out a friend in trouble".
In July 2004, it was reported that he had received a two-month sentence suspended for two years for his third drink-driving offence. He was ordered to pay a A$500 fine and had his driving licence cancelled for 30 months.
In December 2017, he pleaded guilty and was convicted of drink driving, having been found to have a blood alcohol level of 0.055 after drinking "three beers" at a football function.

Tuddenham was inducted into the Australian Football Hall of Fame in 2008.

In 2009 The Australian nominated Tuddenham as one of the 25 greatest footballers never to win a Brownlow medal.

References

External links

Profile at Australian Football
Collingwood's Team of the Century
Collingwood's Hall of Fame

1943 births
Australian rules footballers from Victoria (Australia)
Sydney Swans coaches
Essendon Football Club coaches
Essendon Football Club players
Collingwood Football Club players
Werribee Football Club coaches
Copeland Trophy winners
Australian Football Hall of Fame inductees
Living people
People educated at St Patrick's College, Ballarat